Grants High School is a high school in Grants, New Mexico, United States. It was founded in 1920 and is the only high school in Grants with over 700 students. Grants High School is a part of the Grants-Cibola County School District and also it serves the local communities of Acoma, Bluewater, Laguna, Milan, and San Rafael. The school's mascot is the Pirate (called the Angry Jack) and the colors are red and black. Grants High School is known for recruiting top upcoming basketball players around the state. Grants has had 4 transfers in the past four years.

Athletics and Activities 

State Championships

References

External links
 

Public high schools in New Mexico
Schools in Cibola County, New Mexico
Grants, New Mexico